Peñalolén (Mapudungun "fraternal meeting place") is a Chilean commune in Santiago Province, Santiago Metropolitan Region. It was founded on November 15, 1984.

History
The commune was founded on November 15, 1984.

Drug arrests
During 2019, Chilean police arrested a local family, accusing them of drug trafficking. According to national news channels, the Peñaloléen organization is one of the largest in the Santiago area and operated all over the town.

Demographics
The population grew by 20.2% (36,279 persons) between the 1992 and 2002 censuses.

Stats
Area: 54.2 km²
Population: 238,177 (2006 projection)
Average annual household income: US$43,856 (PPP, 2006)
Population below poverty line: 8.7% (2006)
Regional quality of life index: 74.35, medium, 26 out of 52 (2005)
Human Development Index: 0.743, 52 out of 341 (2003)

Administration
As a commune, Peñalolén is a third-level administrative division of Chile administered by a municipal council, headed by an alcalde (mayor) who is directly elected every four years. , the alcalde is Carolina Leitao (PDC). The communal council has the following members:
 Claudia Mora Vega (RN)
 Marcelo Fierro Yantorno (IND)
 Rogelio Zuñiga Escudero (PDC)
 Juan Urra Rossi (PC)
 Cristian Jofré Delgado (PPD)
 Leonardo Guerra Medina (PPD)
 Estrella Gershanik Frenk (UDI)
 Sergio Guerra Soto (RN)
 Julio Abelleira Figueroa (PS)
 Natalia Garrido Toro (IGUAL)

Mayors
Since 1984, Peñalolén has had five mayors:
María Angélica Cristi (1984–1989, appointed by Pinochet)
Carlos Alarcón (1989–1993, appointed by Aylwin)
Carlos Echeverría (1993–1996)
Carlos Alarcón (1997–2004)
Claudio Orrego (2004-2012)
Carolina Leitao (2012–Present)

Peñalolén is represented in the Chamber of Deputies by Jaime Pilowski (PDC) and José Antonio Kast (UDI) as part of the 24th electoral district (together with La Reina). The commune is represented in the Senate by Manuel José Ossandón (RN) and Carlos Montes (PS) as part of the 8th senatorial constituency (Santiago-East).

Universities
Universidad Adolfo Ibáñez
Universidad Internacional SEK Chile

References

External links
  Municipality of Peñalolén

Populated places in Santiago Province, Chile
Geography of Santiago, Chile
Communes of Chile
Populated places established in 1984
1984 establishments in Chile